Bessie Love (1898–1986) was an actress whose career began in silent films, and continued into sound films, radio, and television. She was also active in the theatre. Her early career was exclusively in American film; after she moved to England in 1935, she performed in productions made only in the U.K., and British productions made in Europe.

Film

Silent: 1916–1928

Triangle Fine Arts 
Love began her career at Triangle Fine Arts, having been discovered by D. W. Griffith.

Pathé Exchange 
In 1918, Pathé Exchange was looking for a new star, and convinced Love to leave Triangle Fine Arts for a salary of $2000/week. The contract empowered her to choose her own cameraman; she selected future Academy Award-winner Clyde De Vinna.

Love made four films with Pathé. They received mixed-to-negative reviews, although Love's performances were consistently praised. Originally released in 1918 and 1919 as 5-reel films, three of the films were edited down to 3 reels, and re-released in 1922 as "Pathé Playlets".

Carolyn of the Corners, Love's final film with Pathé, was released after the first films of her subsequent Vitagraph contract were released, as were the Pathé Playlets.

Vitagraph 
In 1918, Love signed a nine-film contract with Vitagraph, all of which were made, and all of which were directed by David Smith.

Andrew J. Callaghan Productions 
All were box-office failures.

Free agent 
After the failures of her Callaghan-produced films, Love fired her manager, and became a free agent.

She appeared in two series of short films headlined by other actors: The Santschi Series (Tom Santschi) and The Strange Adventures of Prince Courageous (Arthur Trimble).

Sound: 1928–1983 

All of Love's sound films are extant.

Stage

Television

Radio

Erroneous credits 
Love mistakenly has been identified as being in the cast of The Birth of a Nation (1915) as "a Piedmont girl", but she took steps in her later years to clarify that she was not in the film.

The Internet Movie Database lists Love as appearing in a 1915 film entitled Georgia Pearce. "Georgia Pearce" was actually the stage name used by actress Constance Talmadge for one of her roles in Intolerance, and it is not the name of a film.

Some sources include Love in the cast of Meet the Prince (1926). However, no contemporaneous sources do, and some sources note this as an error.

Love does not include any of the above films in her autobiography's filmography.

Notes

References 
Citations

Works cited

External links 
 
 

Actress filmographies
British filmographies
American filmographies